Saginaw Future Inc. (commonly referred to as Saginaw Future or SFI) is a private nonprofit economic development organization that encourages investments in Saginaw, Michigan. It is an Accredited Economic Development Organization (AEDO) by the International Economic Development Council (IEDC). While the organization is private, it is primarily funded by area governments.

History 
Saginaw Future was founded in 1992.

In May 2008, the organization, along with the Michigan Economic Development Corporation, won the CoreNet Global Economic Development and Leadership Award for the two organizations collaborative work securing a planned US$1 billion expansion in Saginaw County by Hemlock Semiconductor Corporation.

In May 2016, the City of Sagianw renewed a US$102,500 per-year agreement, set to expire on December 30, 2020, to support the organization's efforts. While the city has had a relationship with the organization since its founding, the contract was expanded to include coordination of the Sagianw Downtown Development Authority.

Structure 
Saginaw Future is an alliance of businesses in the Saginaw area, the Saginaw County Chamber of Commerce, labor organizations, Saginaw area foundations, 15 local municipal governments, and the governments of Saginaw County and the City of Saginaw.

, the Saginaw city government contributes US$102,500 annually, and the Saginaw county government contributes US$200,000 annually to the organization.

Programs 
Saginaw Future encourages economic investments in the Saginaw area through incentive programs, site allocation and development assistance, business advocacy, and community liaison assistance.

References 

1992 establishments in Michigan
Economic development organizations in the United States
Economy of Michigan
Non-profit organizations based in Michigan
Saginaw, Michigan